Narcissus nevadensis is a species of the genus Narcissus (daffodils) in the family Amaryllidaceae. It is classified in Section Nevadensis. It is native to the Baetic System in Spain. It is considered an endangered species. In 1992 it was designated as a 'priority species' under Annex II of the Habitats Directive in the European Union, which means areas in which it occurs can be declared Special Areas of Conservation, if these areas belong to one of the number of habitats listed in Annex I of the directive.

References 

nevadensis
Garden plants
Flora of Spain
Plants described in 1933